Katie Findlay is a Canadian actress known for portraying Rosie Larsen in the American crime drama television series The Killing. From 2013 to 2014, Findlay portrayed Maggie Landers in The CW's teen drama The Carrie Diaries. From 2014 to 2015, Findlay starred as Rebecca Sutter in the first season of the ABC series How to Get Away with Murder. In 2017 she joined the cast of FXX comedy series Man Seeking Woman in the show's third season.

Early life
Findlay was born in Windsor, Ontario.

Career

After appearing in two CBC pilots, Findlay was cast in the Fox sci-fi series Fringe. She then played Emily in the television film Tangled, and Rosie Larsen, the titular murder victim, in the AMC television series The Killing. She has appeared on several television series including Endgame, Continuum and Stargate Universe. On February 27, 2012, Findlay was cast as Maggie Landers on The CW's teen drama series The Carrie Diaries, a prequel to Sex and the City. In 2012, she landed the role of Bonnie in the science fiction film After the Dark.

In March 2014, Findlay was cast as Rebecca Sutter in Shonda Rhimes' ABC legal drama series How to Get Away with Murder. The same year she was cast in the lead role in the psychological thriller film, The Dark Stranger. In the fourth quarter of 2015, Findlay was cast as the role of Molly Callens in a new Hallmark Channel Christmas two-part movie, The Bridge, based on the novel by Karen Kingsbury; the first part aired on December 6, 2015.

In 2016, Findlay was cast in the third season of the FXX comedy series Man Seeking Woman, as the new love interest of Josh (Jay Baruchel).

Filmography

References

External links
 
 

Living people
21st-century Canadian actresses
Actresses from Windsor, Ontario
Canadian expatriate actresses in the United States
Canadian film actresses
Canadian television actresses
Year of birth missing (living people)